"Use the Man" is a song by American thrash metal band Megadeth. It was released as the third single from their seventh studio album, Cryptic Writings (1997). The song was one of the band's biggest hits, at #15 on the Billboard Mainstream Rock Tracks chart.

Background

Music 

The first half of "Use the Man" contains a rock-oriented sound, while the second half transitions into a faster tempo, more in line with the thrash metal sound the band usually play. The first half features prominent use of acoustic guitars and strings.

The song begins with a sample of Needles and Pins by The Searchers, which was removed for the radio edit and remaster.

Lyrics 

The lyrics for "Use the Man" were inspired by a recovering addict who went to a halfway house, shot up (on Heroin), and died.

Live 
"Use the Man" has been performed 194 times by Megadeth, as well as once by both Mustaine and David Ellefson. Since the band reformed in 2004, it has been played only a handful of times, and exclusively at acoustic concerts. The song was among the first Mustaine played live after his arm injury which caused him to be unable to play guitar.

Track listing

Chart performance

Personnel 

Megadeth
 Dave Mustaine – guitars, lead vocals
 David Ellefson – bass, backing vocals
 Marty Friedman – guitars, backing vocals, acoustic guitar
 Nick Menza – drums, backing vocals

Production
Dann Huff – production
Dave Mustaine – co-production
Jeff Balding – recording, mixing
Mark Hagen –  recording assistant, mixing assistant
Bob Ludwig – mastering
Bud Prager – A & R direction, E.S.P. management
Mike Renault – E.S.P. management
Giles Martin – producer (remaster)

2004 remaster/remix
Produced by Dave Mustaine
Mixed by Ralph Patlan and Dave Mustaine
Engineered by Ralph Patlan with Lance Dean
Edited by Lance Dean, Scott "Sarge" Harrison, and Keith Schreiber with Bo Caldwell
Mastered by Tom Baker

References 

Megadeth songs
1997 songs
1997 singles
Songs written by Dave Mustaine
Songs about drugs
Songs about heroin